Martin Braud (born 6 January 1982 in Angoulême) is a French slalom canoeist who competed at the international level from 1998 to 2008.

Career
Braud won a silver medal in the C2 team event at the 2007 ICF Canoe Slalom World Championships. He also won five medals at the European Championships (1 gold, 3 silvers and 1 bronze).

Braud finished fourth in the C2 event at the 2008 Summer Olympics in Beijing.

His partner in the C2 boat throughout his active career was Cédric Forgit.

World Cup individual podiums

1 European Championship counting for World Cup points
2 Pan American Championship counting for World Cup points

References

1982 births
Living people
People from Angoulême
Canoeists at the 2008 Summer Olympics
French male canoeists
Olympic canoeists of France
Medalists at the ICF Canoe Slalom World Championships
Sportspeople from Charente